Norman Judd (6 April 1904 – 19 November 1980) was an Irish water polo player. He competed in the men's tournament at the 1928 Summer Olympics.

References

External links
 

1904 births
1980 deaths
Irish male water polo players
Olympic water polo players of Ireland
Water polo players at the 1928 Summer Olympics
Sportspeople from Dublin (city)